Pacorus, also known as Aurelius Pacorus or Bakur (Latinized: Bacurius, Aurelius Pacorus ) was a Parthian Prince who served as one of the Kings of Armenia in the 2nd century.

Pacorus was a son of the Parthian monarch Vologases IV. He is known from a Greek funeral inscription in Rome as a dedication from him in honoring the memory of his brother Aurelius Merithates. In the inscription dedication Pacorus describes himself as:
Αύρήλιος Πάκορος βασιλεύς μεγάλης Άρμενίας
or from the Greek translation 
Aurelius Pacorus King of Greater Armenia

From the inscription it is evident that Pacorus' brother lived and died in Rome. The inscription also shows that Pacorus lived for a time in Rome and had friends in Rome. The name Aurelius points to a close connection with the imperial house of the Nerva–Antonine dynasty. At some point Pacorus and his brother received Roman citizenship from an emperor of the Nerva–Antonine dynasty, perhaps from Lucius Verus either before or after Pacorus' Armenian Kingship.

Pacorus is known to have ruled Armenia in the second century and is the only Pacorus to be appointed as King of Armenia by a ruling King of Parthia who was removed by Lucius Verus. During the Roman Parthian War of 161-166, Vologases IV of Parthia in 161/162 entered the Roman Client Kingdom of Armenia, expelled the Roman Client Armenian King Sohaemus and installed Pacorus as a Parthian Client King of Armenia.

Pacorus served as an Armenian King from 161 until 163 when Lucius Verus arrived with the Roman Army in Armenia. Pacorus was dethroned by the Romans when they captured Armenia and the Armenian capital. After Pacorus was dethroned, Sohaemus was reinstalled to his Armenian Kingship. Pacorus' fate is unknown afterwards, however he may have been brought to live in Rome by Lucius Verus.

References

Sources
  

 
 
 D. Braund, Rome and the Friendly King: The Character of the Client Kingship, Taylor & Francis, 1984
 A. De Jong, Traditions of the Magi: Zoroastrianism in Greek and Latin Literature, BRILL, 1997
 M.C. Fronto & M.P.J. Van Den Hout, A Commentary on the Letters of M. Cornelius Fronto, BRILL, 1999
 A. Birley, Marcus Aurelius, Routledge, 2000
 R.G. Hovannisian, The Armenian People From Ancient to Modern Times, Volume I: The Dynastic Periods: From Antiquity to the Fourteenth Century, Palgrave Macmillan, 2004

See also
 Roman–Parthian War of 161–166
 Emperorship of Marcus Aurelius

2nd-century kings of Armenia
Arsacid kings of Armenia
2nd-century Iranian people
Parthian princes
2nd-century Romans
People of the Roman–Parthian Wars